Makin' Memories is a studio album by American country music artist Dottie West. It was released in December 1969 on RCA Victor Records and was produced by Danny Davis. Her thirteenth studio album, Makin' Memories was also her third to be released in 1969. The album included three singles that became minor hits on the national music publication charts.

Background and content
Makin' Memories was produced by Danny Davis in September 1969 at RCA Studio B. It was West's third album collaboration with Davis, who produced her two previous 1969 studio albums. According to the project's liner notes, studio sessions took place as late as one o'clock in the morning. Other artists and producers watched to hear West record during these sessions including Chet Atkins (her former producer) and Waylon Jennings. The album was a collection of 11 tracks. Most of the track were new recordings. Both the title track and "Clinging to My Baby's Hand" were composed by West herself. Also included in the album was a cover of "With Pen in Hand", a song first made a country hit by Johnny Darrell and later a pop hit by Vikki Carr.

Release and chart performance
Makin' Memories was released in December 1969 on RCA Victor Records, becoming her thirteenth studio album issued in her career. The album was originally issued as a vinyl LP, containing six songs on "side one" and five songs on "side two". Although Makin' Memories did not chart on the Billboard Top Country Albums survey, it did produce three singles. The first to be released was "Clinging to My Baby's Hand". Issued in September 1969, the song became a minor hit after it reached number 47 on the Billboard Hot Country Singles chart. In January 1970, "I Heard Our Song" was released as the record's second single and peaked at number 45 on the country songs chart. The third single, "Long Black Limousine" (released in March 1970), did not make a Billboard chart appearance.

Track listing

Personnel
All credits are adapted from the liner notes of Makin' Memories.

Musical personnel
 Harold Bradley – guitar
 Ray Edenton – guitar
 Buddy Harman – drums
 Grady Martin – guitar
 Bob Moore – bass
 Ferrell Morris – vibes
 The Nashville Edition – background vocals
 Hargus "Pig" Robbins – piano
 Bill West – steel guitar
 Dottie West – lead vocals

Technical personnel
 Danny Davis – producer

Release history

References

1969 albums
Albums produced by Danny Davis (country musician)
Dottie West albums
RCA Records albums